Real Valladolid Club de Fútbol, S.A.D., or simply Real Valladolid or Valladolid, is a professional football club based in Valladolid, Castile and León, Spain that competes in La Liga, the top tier of the Spanish league system.

The club colours are violet and white, used on the kit in stripes from its foundation on 20 June 1928. The team plays its home games at the Estadio José Zorrilla, which seats 27,846 spectators. Valladolid's honours include a single trophy of great relevance, the defunct Copa de la Liga 1983–84. It has been runner-up in the Copa del Rey on two occasions (1949–50 and 1988–89), and has participated in two editions of the UEFA Cup (1984–85 and 1997–98) and also one edition of the UEFA Cup Winners' Cup (1989–90). The team subsidiary, the Real Valladolid Promesas, currently play in the Primera División RFEF.

Since its La Liga debut in the 1948–49 season (in which it became the first club from the region to play in La Liga – five others have since done so), Valladolid is the most successful football club in Castile and León by honours and history, with a total of 45 seasons in the First Division, 36 in the Second and 10 in the Third. Historically, Valladolid is the 13th-best team in Spain by overall league points. Two of its players have won the Pichichi Trophy: Manuel Badenes and Jorge da Silva; and ten were internationals with the Spain national football team. In the 21st century, the club's domestic performance follows a yo-yo club pattern, with multiple promotions to (and relegations from) the first division.

On 3 September 2018, it was announced that Brazilian former international footballer Ronaldo Nazario had become the majority shareholder after purchasing a 51% controlling stake in the club. , Ronaldo is owner of 82% of the club shares.

History

20th-century history (1928–2001) 

Real Valladolid was founded from the merger of Real Unión Deportiva de Valladolid and Club Deportivo Español, the club played its first game on September 22, 1928. It was a 2–1 win over Alavés. Valladolid first reached the top level in the 1947–48 season, as champions of the Segunda División. The club became the first Castile and León club to play in the Spanish top flight. The following year, the team pushed on from this success and reached the finals of the Copa Del Rey in Chamartín Stadium against Athletic Bilbao, losing 4–1.

The next ten years were spent in the first division, and relegation was short-lived as Valladolid gained promotion again in 1958–59 with a 5–0 win over Terrassa under manager José Luis Saso, a legendary figure in club history. He had originally been a goalkeeper for the club and went on to perform many roles, including serving as president of the club.

Valladolid swung between the first and second divisions in subsequent years, falling as low as to the third division in 1970–71. Next year the club was promoted to second division and in 1980 promoted to first division, where Valladolid played until 1992 when the club was relegated to the second division again. Promoted in 1992–93, the club was again sent down after the 2003–04 season. In 1984, Valladolid also won the Copa de la Liga (a competition only played in the early 1980s) over Atlético Madrid.

On 14 April 1996, Valladolid played its 1,000th game in La Liga.

The side's highest position during this 11-year stint was seventh in 1996–97, being coached in the previous seasons by former Real Madrid Castilla coach Rafael Benítez, as various players from that team would also later appear for Valladolid.

Carlos Suárez era (2001–2018) 

In the 2006–07 season, after signing Basque José Luis Mendilibar as head coach, Valladolid had one of its best years in its history while playing in the second level. The club took the league lead in the 15th matchday and went on to finish with a competition all-time high 88 points, winning the championship by a total margin of eight points, and holding an advantage of 26 points over the non-promotion zone (fourth and below), both being all-time records in the league. Valladolid also achieved the honour of going unbeaten in 29-straight matches, from 10 October 2006 to 6 May 2007, being mathematically promoted after a 2–0 away win against Tenerife on 22 April 2007 (the 34th matchday of the season), the earliest any club has achieved promotion in Spanish history.

Also remarkable was the side's role in the season's Copa del Rey, reaching the quarter-finals after defeating two top division teams, Gimnàstic de Tarragona (4–1 aggregate) and the 2005–06 UEFA Champions League contender Villarreal (3–1), while playing the entire competition with reserve players.

Two relatively successful seasons in the top division followed, finishing in 15th place while avoiding relegation after a 1–1 draw on the last matchday of both seasons (against Recreativo de Huelva in 2007–08 and Real Betis in the following campaign).

After a slow start to 2009–10 (three wins in the first 20 matches), Mendilibar was sacked on 1 February 2010 following a draw at home against Almería. The week following his sacking, Valladolid dropped into the relegation zone (something that never happened during Mendilibar's 138-match stint), with former player Onésimo Sánchez taking charge.

After only one win in 10 matches, Sánchez was fired. Former Spain national team manager Javier Clemente was named Sánchez's replacement in a desperate move to avoid relegation with only eight matches remaining. After a brief breather (16th position), Valladolid again returned to the bottom three, then faced a must-win last game at the Camp Nou against a Barcelona squad needing a win to secure the Liga championship. Level in the standings with Racing de Santander, Málaga and Tenerife for the two final safe positions, Valladolid lost 0–4 and consequently was relegated, ending a three-year stay in the top flight.

The 2011–12 season saw Valladolid return to La Liga under the management of Miroslav Đukić, promoted through the play-offs after finishing third in the division.

Valladolid were relegated back to the Segunda División on the last matchday of the 2013–14 season.

On 2017–18 season, Valladolid was promoted back to first division after four years via play-off defeating Sporting de Gijón and Numancia.

Ronaldo Nazario, new owner (2018–present) 

On 3 September 2018, it was announced Brazilian former international footballer Ronaldo had become the majority shareholder after purchasing a 51% controlling stake in the club. In its first season with the new owner Valladolid finished in 16th position in La Liga. As of April 2020, Ronaldo owned 82% of the club shares.

In August 2020, with the Promesas (reserve team) well established in Segunda División B, the club made an agreement with local club Atlético Tordesillas, operating at the level below, to act as a further affiliated team for its young players. At the end of the 2020–21 season, Real Valladolid was relegated following a 1–2 home defeat by Atlético, which also secured the Colchoneros the La Liga title on the final matchday, ending Valladolid's three-year stay in first division.

In the 2021–22 season, Valladolid returned to La Liga by sealing a 2nd position in the table (81 points, tied on points with the first team), thus guaranteeing the team direct promotion to the top flight.

Stadium

Real Valladolid play at the 26,421-capacity Estadio Nuevo José Zorrilla, finished in 1982 to replace the previous stadium of the same name which had stood since 1940(increased it’s capacity from 27,846). Both grounds are named after José Zorrilla y Moral, a 19th-century poet from the city. After opening for the club on 20 February 1982, it hosted the Copa del Rey Final on 13 April of that year, and then three Group D matches at the 1982 FIFA World Cup. The venue is owned by the Ayuntamiento de Valladolid.

In 2010, it was announced that there were plans to expand the stadium to 40,000 spectators. This project was known as Valladolid Arena , but was contingent on Spain winning the right to host the 2018 FIFA World cup.

Season to season

The following list shows Valladolid's record as well as all the presidents and coaches for every season since its foundation in 1929. All presidents and coaches are Spanish unless otherwise noted.

46 seasons in La Liga
35 seasons in Segunda División
10 seasons in Tercera División

European competition history

UEFA Cup

UEFA Cup Winners' Cup

Current squad
.

Reserve team

Out on loan

Technical staff

Honours

League
Segunda División: 1947–48, 1958–59, 2006–07
Tercera División: 1933–34

Cups
Copa de la Liga: 1984
Copa Real Federación Española de Fútbol:  1952–53
Records
Most games unbeaten in Segunda División: 29 (2006–07)
Earliest promotion in Segunda División: Day 34 (out of 42), 22 April 2007
Fastest goal in La Liga history: 7.42 seconds, scored by Joseba Llorente on 20 January 2008, vs Espanyol (2–1 win)

Notable players

See also

Real Valladolid B – Valladolid's B team
Real Valladolid (women)

References

External links

Official website 
Futbolme team profile 
BDFutbol team profile

 
Football clubs in Castile and León
La Liga clubs
Association football clubs established in 1928
V
1928 establishments in Spain
Segunda División clubs